The Amazing Race 6  is the sixth season of the American reality television series The Amazing Race. It featured eleven teams of two racing around the world.

The season premiered on CBS on November 16, 2004, and concluded on February 8, 2005.

Engaged couple Freddy Holliday and Kendra Bentley were the winners of this season, while dating couple Jon Buehler and Kris Perkins finished in second place, and exes Adam Malis and Rebecca Cardon finished in third.

Production

Development and filming

In May 2004, CBS ordered the sixth season of the show, despite the fact that The Amazing Race 5 had not yet aired. Early renewal was likely due to the success of the changes made in season 5. CBS also delayed the airing of season 6 until late in the fall and moved it out of its proposed Saturday timeslot in order to create a "cool down" period between races, in the hopes that this would help continue the newfound ratings success.

The 30 days of filming began on August 13, 2004, and finished on September 12. The Amazing Race made its first trip to seven new countries: Iceland, Norway, Sweden, Hungary, Sri Lanka, Ethiopia, and Senegal.

This season was the first in which team members had to complete an equal number of Roadblock tasks. No team member was permitted to complete more than six Roadblocks on the entire race. Throughout the season, host Phil Keoghan verbally stated this rule when introducing each leg's Roadblock. This season also reduced the number of times the Yield appeared to three, compared to the previous season, where the Yield had been featured in almost every leg. This trend would continue in subsequent seasons.

A task in the second leg marked the first time that teams were required to work with each other. The ten teams had to split themselves into two groups of five, each of which had to row a Viking boat across a fjord.

According to Aaron Crumbaugh, the sixth leg was originally planned as two separate legs with the first part being a non-elimination point, where the losing team would have been stripped of their money. However, those planned legs were combined into one after producers realized that begging was illegal in Hungary.

This season featured a visit to Sri Lanka, where filming occurred just a few months before the 2004 Indian Ocean earthquake and tsunami. The episodes aired after the earthquake had devastated the locations the teams had visited. A special message was inserted at the beginning of the episodes in Sri Lanka, dedicating them to the victims and to those helping with the recovery.

Cast

This season's cast included married professional wrestlers, dating actors, Jewish high school buddies, engaged models, and a team of married entrepreneurs. Early Show hosts Harry Smith and Dave Price ran the season's first leg with the actual teams as part of a special segment on their morning show.

Future appearances
Jonathan & Victoria appeared on a Dr. Phil special to try to improve their marriage. Jonathan & Victoria then competed on Battle of the Network Reality Stars. Later, in a celebrity version of Fear Factor, Victoria attacked contestant Jon "Jonny Fairplay" Dalton (of Survivor: Pearl Islands), and Jonathan attacked host Joe Rogan, resulting in their expulsion from the show. Aaron competed on the twelfth season of Food Network Star and on Cutthroat Kitchen. Victoria had a cameo appearance on Whose Line is it Anyway?. Rebecca Cardon was in the reality show Kill Reality and appeared on the Bravo reality series Work Out.

Results
The following teams are listed with their placements in each leg. Placements are listed in finishing order. 
A  placement with a dagger indicates that the team was eliminated. 
An  placement with a double-dagger indicates that the team was the last to arrive at a pit stop in a non-elimination leg. As a penalty, they were stripped of all their money and were not given any at the start of the next leg.
An italicized placement means it is a team's placement at the midpoint of a double leg.
A  indicates that the team won the Fast Forward. 
A  indicates that the team used the Yield and a  indicates the team on the receiving end of the Yield.

Notes

Race summary

Leg 1 (United States → Iceland)

Episode 1: "The Game's Afoot" (November 16, 2004)
Prize: A vacation to Hawaii (awarded to Hayden & Aaron)
Eliminated: Avi & Joe
Locations
Chicago, Illinois (Buckingham Fountain) (Starting Line)
 Chicago (O'Hare International Airport)
 Chicago → Reykjavík, Iceland
Suðurland (Seljalandsfoss Waterfall)
Suðurland (Vatnajökull)
Hornafjörður (Breiðamerkursandur)
Svínafell (Hótel Skaftafell)  Hornafjörður (Jökulsárlón) 
Grindavík (Blue Lagoon) 
Episode summary
From Buckingham Fountain, teams had to race into downtown Chicago and travel by subway to O'Hare International Airport, where they had to fly to Reykjavík, Iceland. Once in Iceland, teams had to choose a car with their next clue, which instructed them to drive to the Seljalandsfoss Waterfall in order to retrieve their next clue.
At the base of Vatnajökull, teams had to sign up for a shuttle bus to take them  to their next clue at the glacier's edge.
Departing the next morning, teams took a shuttle bus back down the glacier, where they retrieved their next clue, which instructed teams to drive to Breiðamerkursandur in order to find their next clue.
 This season's first Detour was a choice between Ice Climb or Ice Search. In Ice Climb, teams had to travel  to the Hótel Skaftafell and use special gear to climb the face of an ice wall in order to reach their next clue at the top. In Ice Search, teams had to travel to a nearby glacial lagoon and use a boat to search the  lagoon with thousands of icebergs for an orange buoy with their next clue.
Teams had to check in at the pit stop: the Blue Lagoon in Grindavík.

Leg 2 (Iceland → Norway)

Episode 2: "I'm Not His Wife, He Doesn't Need to Scream at Me" (November 23, 2004)
Prize: A seven-night cruise in Alaska (awarded to Kris & Jon)
Eliminated: Meredith & Maria
Locations
Grindavík (Blue Lagoon) 
 Reykjavík → Oslo, Norway
Oslo (Holmenkollbakken) 
Brandbu (Raukr Viking Village)
 Hønefoss → Voss
Voss (Bridge) 
Voss (Nesheimstunet) 
Episode summary
At the beginning of this leg, teams were instructed to fly to Oslo, Norway. Once in Oslo, teams had to make their way to the Holmenkollbakken in order to find their next clue.
 In this season's first Roadblock, one team member had to climb to the top of the ski jump and then ride a zip-line  to the bottom in order to receive their next clue. 
After completing the Roadblock, teams had to travel to the Viking village at Brandbu, where the ten teams were split into two groups and each group had to row a Viking ship across a fjord to their next clue. Teams were instructed to travel by train to Voss and then drive to a specific bridge in order to find their next clue.
 This leg's Detour was a choice between Endurance or Accuracy. In Endurance, teams had to roller ski down a  course in order to receive their next clue. In Accuracy, teams had to successfully complete three traditional Viking games. They had to first throw sticks to knock over a circle of eight logs called kubbs before knocking over the king in the center. One team member then had to throw an axe into a tree trunk target so that it stuck.
Teams had to check in at the pit stop: the Nesheimstunet in Voss.

Leg 3 (Norway → Sweden)

Episode 3: "Counting Bears Is Not Rocket Science" (November 30, 2004)
Prize: A seven-night cruise to the Mexican Riviera (awarded to Hayden & Aaron)
Eliminated: Lena & Kristy
Locations
Voss (Nesheimstunet) 
 Voss → Oslo
 Oslo → Stockholm, Sweden
Stockholm (Nordic Sea Hotel – Ice Bar)
Stockholm (Kungens Kurva – IKEA) 
 Stockholm → Häggvik
 Häggvik (Bögs Gård Farm) 
 Häggvik → Stockholm
Stockholm (Skeppsholmen – af Chapman) 
Episode summary
At the beginning of this leg, teams were instructed to return to Oslo by train and then travel by bus to Stockholm, Sweden. Once in Stockholm, teams had to make their way to the Ice Bar of the Nordic Sea Hotel, where each team member had to slide ice shot glasses across the bar. If either team member landed a glass on a target at the end, they could receive their next clue, which directed them to the IKEA store in Kungens Kurva. If both members missed, they had to go back to the end of the line to try again.
 This leg's Detour was a choice between Count It or Build It. In Count It, teams had to count the number of cooking pots, frying pans, and stuffed animals in three large bins and give the correct number to the supervisor in order to receive their next clue. In Build It, teams had to properly assemble a desk using all of the provided parts and an instruction manual in order to receive their next clue.
After completing the Detour, teams had to travel by train to Häggvik and then ride a tandem bicycle  to Bögs Gård Farm in order to find their next clue.
 In this leg's Roadblock, one team member had to unroll and search through 270 hay bales in order to find one of the 20 bales that contained their next clue.
After completing the Roadblock, teams had to ride their tandem bicycle back to the train station, travel by train back to Stockholm, and then check in at the pit stop aboard the af Chapman, moored at Skeppsholmen in Stockholm.
Additional notes
The hay bale task was later revisited in season 15 as a Switchback.
Lena spent over eight hours unrolling hay bales, but was never able to find a clue envelope during the Roadblock. Two hours after all of the other teams had checked in at the pit stop, Phil came out to the farm to inform Lena & Kristy of their elimination.

Leg 4 (Sweden → Senegal)

Episode 4: "What If It Isn't Sanitary" (December 7, 2004)
Prize: A seven-night cruise to the Western Caribbean (awarded to Kris & Jon)
Locations
Stockholm (Skeppsholmen – af Chapman) 
Stockholm (Town Hall Tower)
 Stockholm → Dakar, Senegal
Dakar (Cimetière Bel-Air )
Kayar (Vieux Ngom Carpenter Shop) 
Cap-Vert (Lac Rose) 
 Dakar → Gorée Island
Gorée Island (Rue des Batteries) 
Episode summary
At the beginning of this episode, teams went to the Town Hall Tower, where they were instructed to fly to Dakar, Senegal. Once in Dakar, teams had to search outside the airport for their next clue, which included the poem "Femme noire", and instructions to find the author's grave. Teams had to figure out that the author was former Senegalese President Léopold Sédar Senghor, whose grave was at the Bel Aire Cemetery. There, the teams' next clue directed them to the Vieux Ngom Carpenter Shop.
 This leg's Detour was a choice between Stack 'Em Up or Pull 'Em Up. In Stack 'Em Up, teams had carry baskets of fish to a drying table and properly stack enough fish in order to cover the table and receive their next clue. In Pull 'Em Up, teams had to travel on fishing boats to a specified area, use traditional fishing gear to catch four fish, and then bring the fish to the shore, where they received their next clue.
After completing the Detour, teams had to travel to the Lac Rose, where they found their next clue.
 In this leg's Roadblock, one team member had to use the traditional tools provided and harvest enough salt from the bed of the Lac Rose and fill a  basket in order to receive their next clue.
Teams had to travel by ferry to Gorée Island and find the pit stop.
Additional notes
This was a non-elimination leg.

Leg 5 (Senegal → Germany)

Episode 5: "Quit Following Us" (December 14, 2004)
Prize: A vacation to Mexico (awarded to Freddy & Kendra)
Eliminated: Don & Mary Jean
Locations
Gorée Island (Rue des Batteries) 
Gorée Island (House of Slaves)
 Gorée Island → Dakar
 Dakar → Berlin, Germany
 Berlin (East Side Gallery)
Berlin (Tauentzienstraße – Broken Chain Sculpture)
Berlin (Brauhaus Spandau Bar  Zitadelle) 
Berlin (Teufelsberg) 
Berlin (Brandenburg Gate) 
Episode summary
At the beginning of this leg, teams walked to the House of Slaves, where they learned about the history of the African slave trade on Gorée Island. Afterwards, each team laid a single rose at the historic archway known as the "Door of No Return" as a tribute to all of the victims before being given their next clue, which instructed teams to fly to Berlin, Germany.
Once in Berlin, teams traveled to the East Side Gallery, where they searched a stretch of the former Berlin Wall for their next clue. From there, teams made their way to the Broken Chain Sculpture across the street from the Kaiser Wilhelm Memorial Church in order to find their next clue.
 This leg's Detour was a choice between Beer or Brats. In Beer, teams traveled to the Brauhaus Spandau bar, where each team member had to search the tables at the crowded bar for five coasters bearing their teams' names and pictures. They then had to trade two full beer steins to the patron in exchange for each coaster. Once both team members collected five of their coasters, they received their next clue. In Brats, teams traveled to the Zitadelle, where they had to use a hand-operated sausage maker to create one rope of five  bratwursts in order to receive their next clue.
 In this leg's Roadblock, one team member had to climb to the top of Teufelsberg and complete a soap box derby course in 37 seconds or less in order to receive their next clue. 
Teams had to check in at the pit stop: the Brandenburg Gate in Berlin.

Leg 6 (Germany → Hungary)

Episode 6: "They Should Probably Have Some Counseling" (December 21, 2004)& Episode 7: "One of You, I'm Gonna Break in Half" (January 4, 2005)
Prize: A vacation to Europe (awarded to Lori & Bolo)
Eliminated: Gus & Hera
Locations
Berlin (Brandenburg Gate) 
Berlin (Checkpoint Charlie)
Berlin (Olympic Stadium) 
 Berlin → Budapest, Hungary
Eger (Eger Castle) 
 Eger → Budapest
Budapest (Net Klub Internet Kafé)
Budapest (Heritage Rail Museum)
Budapest (Buda Castle – Budavári Labirintus) 
Budapest (Margit Island – Alfréd Hajós National Swimming Stadium) 
Budapest (Gundel Restaurant) 
Budapest (Point Zero)
Budapest (Fisherman's Bastion) 
Episode summary (Episode 6)
At the beginning of this leg, teams made their way to Checkpoint Charlie, where they received their next clue, which directed them to the Olympic Stadium.
 In this leg's first Roadblock, one team member was strapped into a "hot rocket bungee" and launched  into the air. After returning to the ground, they received their next clue.
Teams were instructed to fly to Budapest, Hungary. Once in Budapest, teams had to drive a Trabant 601 to Eger Castle, where they found their next clue.
 This leg's first Detour was a choice between Catapult Crash or Cannonball Run. In Catapult Crash, teams had to use a catapult to hurl a watermelon  onto a wooden target in order to retrieve the clue hidden within. In Cannonball Run, teams had to push a cannon up a hill to the castle courtyard, and then carry 55  cannonballs and stack them into a pyramid next to the cannon in order to receive their next clue.
After completing this first Detour, teams traveled by train back to Budapest and then traveled by taxi to the Net Klub Internet Kafé. Teams logged into their AOL accounts and received a clue via e-mail, which informed them that they were still racing.
Episode summary (Episode 7)
Teams were directed to travel by taxi to Margaret Island on the Danube River and then go to the Alfréd Hajós National Swimming Stadium, where they found their next clue.
 For this season's first Fast Forward, one team had to travel to Buda Castle. There, they had to descend through a cavernous labyrinth, where they discovered that they had to drink a goblet of pig's blood. Lori & Bolo won the Fast Forward.
 This leg's second Detour was a choice between Swim or Paddle. In Swim, teams had to play a game of water polo and score one goal against a Hungarian water polo player in order to receive their next clue. In Paddle, teams had to inflate a raft with a hand pump and paddle across the Danube River to a flag on the other side in order to retrieve their next clue.
After completing the second Detour, teams were instructed to make their way to the Gundel Restaurant, where they found their next clue.
 In this leg's second Roadblock, one team member had to eat a  bowl of a traditional Hungarian spicy soup in order to receive their next clue.
After completing the second Roadblock, teams had to make their way to Point Zero, and then either take the funicular or make their way on foot to the pit stop: Fisherman's Bastion in Budapest.
Additional notes
Leg 6 was a double leg and aired over two separate episodes.

Leg 7 (Hungary → France)

Episode 8: "Tell My Mom I Love Her" (January 11, 2005)
Prize: A vacation to the Caribbean (awarded to Adam & Rebecca)
Locations
Budapest (Fisherman's Bastion) 
Budapest (Budafok – Promontor Borudvar)
 Budapest → Ajaccio, France
Ajaccio (Maison Bonaparte)
Ajaccio (Ajaccio Harbor) 
Calvi (Camp Raffalli) 
Zilia (Domaine 'Alzipratu Winery) 
L'Île-Rousse (La Pietra) 
Episode summary
At the beginning of this leg, teams had to travel to the Promontor Borudvar winery and follow a marked path toward a  wine cask in order to find their next clue, which instructed them to fly to the French island of Corsica. Once in Ajaccio, teams had to travel to Napoleon's birthplace and find the room where he was born in order to receive their next clue. Teams were directed to drive to Camp Raffalli in Calvi in order to find their next clue.
 For this season's last Fast Forward, one team had to locate a harbor in Ajaccio, don old-style diving suits, and walk across the ocean floor to a lobster trap in order to retrieve the Fast Forward award. Adam & Rebecca won the Fast Forward.
 This leg's Detour was a choice between Climb Up or Fly Behind. In Climb Up, teams had to use a mechanical ascender to climb a  rock wall. Once at the top, teams had to find a French Legionnaire, who gave them a medal, and then rappel  back down to receive their next clue. In Fly Behind, teams had to choose a Zodiac boat and, with one member directing the pilot and the other trailing behind on a raft, search among 25 buoys for one with a clue attached.
After completing the Detour, teams were instructed to travel to the Domaine 'Alzipratu Winery in Zilia, where they found their next clue.
Teams had to check in at the pit stop: La Pietra in L'Île-Rousse. 
Additional notes
This was a non-elimination leg.

Leg 8 (France → Ethiopia)

Episode 9: "Are There Instructions on Donkey Handling?" (January 18, 2005)
Prize: A vacation to Mexico (awarded to Hayden & Aaron)
Eliminated: Jonathan & Victoria
Locations
L'Île-Rousse (La Pietra) 
 Calvi → Nice
Nice (City Garden  – Statue of Albert I)
 Nice → Addis Ababa, Ethiopia
 Addis Ababa → Lalibela
North Wollo (Lewz Village) 
Lalibela (St. George's Church)  
Lalibela (Lookout) 
Episode summary
At the start of this leg, teams traveled by ferry to Nice, and then made their way to the city gardens, where they found their next clue at a bust of Albert I. Teams were instructed to fly to Addis Ababa, Ethiopia. Once in Addis Ababa, teams had to sign up for one of two charter flights to Lalibela. There, teams found their next clue on the windshields of vans outside the airport. Teams then directed their driver to take them to the overlook of Lewz Village.
 This leg's Detour was a choice between Raise the Roof or Mud the Hut. In Raise the Roof, teams assisted a group of locals carrying a roof  and then placed it on top of a house. Once the roof was on, one team member had to place a jug on the roof in order to receive their next clue. In Mud the Hut, teams had to use a plaster made of dirt, water, and straw to cover an entire wall of a traditional Ethiopian house in order to receive their next clue. 
 In this leg's Roadblock, one team member had to enter the Church of Saint George, where they received a pendant from the head priest. They then had to search among hundreds of worshipers outside of the church for the one wearing the same pendant, which could be traded for their next clue. 
Teams had to check in at the nearby pit stop in Lalibela.
Additional notes
 Adam & Rebecca chose to Yield Freddy & Kendra.

Leg 9 (Ethiopia → Sri Lanka)

Episode 10: "It Always Comes Down to Details" (January 25, 2005)
Prize: A vacation to Europe (awarded to Kris & Jon)
Eliminated: Lori & Bolo
Locations
Lalibela (Lookout) 
 Lalibela → Addis Ababa
Addis Ababa (Addis Ababa Stadium)
 Addis Ababa → Colombo, Sri Lanka
 Colombo → Galle
Galle (Fort Galle)
Galle (Coconut Plantation  Mahinda College Cricket Field) 
 Galle → Kandy
Kandy (Kandyan Art Association)
Kandy (Temple of the Tooth)
 Kandy → Dambulla
Sigiriya (Lion Rock) 
Sigiriya (Hotel Sigiriya) 
Episode summary
At the start of this leg, teams returned to Lalibela Airport and signed up for one of two charter flights back to Addis Ababa. Once there, teams had to make their way to the Addis Ababa Stadium, where they chose two local runners with whom they completed a four-man track relay before receiving their next clue. 
Teams were then instructed to fly to Colombo, Sri Lanka. Once in Colombo, teams had to travel by train to Galle and find their next clue at Fort Galle.
 This leg's Detour was a choice between Tree Trunks or Elephant Trunks. In Tree Trunks, teams traveled  by tuk-tuk to a coconut plantation. Once there, each person had to climb to the top of a  tree and retrieve a jug filled with tree sap, which they had to pour into a container in order to receive their next clue. In Elephant Trunks, teams traveled  by tuk-tuk to an elephant polo field, where each team member had to ride an elephant down the length of the field, hitting a polo ball around a large pole and scoring a goal in order to receive their next clue.
After completing the Detour, teams had to travel by bus to Kandy and make their way to the Kandyan Art Association, where they had to purchase an offering, which they exchanged at the nearby Temple of the Tooth for their next clue. Teams were then instructed to travel by bus to Dambulla.
 In this leg's Roadblock, one team member had to ascend more than 1,000 steps to the top of Lion Rock. Once they located the hotel, teams had to proceed there and swim the length of the pool before checking in at the pit stop.

Leg 10 (Sri Lanka → China)

Episode 11: "You Deal with This Before I Hyperventilate" (February 1, 2005)
Prize: A vacation to Hawaii (awarded to Hayden & Aaron)
Locations
Sigiriya (Hotel Sigiriya) 
 Colombo → Shanghai, China
Shanghai (Yuyuan Garden)
Shanghai (Huaneng Union Tower) 
Shanghai (HuaXia Bank Tower) 
Shanghai (The Bund – Monument to the People's Heroes)
Shanghai (Jiangpu Road) 
Shanghai (Peace Hotel South) 
Episode summary
At the beginning of this leg, teams were instructed to fly to Shanghai, China. Once in Shanghai, teams had to search the grounds at Yuyuan Garden for their next clue. Teams were then directed to the Huaneng Union Tower, where they found their next clue.
 In this leg's Roadblock, one team member had to wash a window on the exterior of the HuaXia Bank Tower, forty stories above the ground, in order to reveal a hidden message. Once they could read the message, they had to lower themselves to the ground and repeat the message to the supervisor, who then handed them their next clue.
At the Monument to the People's Heroes on The Bund, teams had to find a group of tai chi performers and search for one of four masters, who had their next clue.
 This leg's Detour was a choice between Bricks or Ice. In Bricks, teams had to use a traditional device to transport 300 clay bricks off a barge while balancing on a narrow wooden plank. From there, they had to stack the bricks on a wooden pallet in order to receive their clue. In Ice, teams had to load two  blocks of ice onto the back of flatbed tricycles and deliver them to a fish market four blocks away. Once there, they had to break them into smaller pieces and place them into a tub in order to receive their next clue. 
Teams had to check in at the pit stop: the Peace Hotel South in Shanghai.
Additional notes
 Freddy & Kendra chose to Yield Adam & Rebecca.
This was a non-elimination leg.

Leg 11 (China)

Episode 12: "4 Continents, 24 Cities, 40,000 Miles" (February 8, 2005)
Prize: A vacation to the Caribbean (awarded to Kris & Jon)
Eliminated: Hayden & Aaron
Locations
Shanghai (Peace Hotel South) 
 Shanghai → Xi'an
Xi'an (Drum Tower)
Xi'an (BYD Auto Factory  Xi'an Tang Du Factory) 
Xi'an (Terra Cotta Warriors Museum)
 Huayin (Mount Hua – North Peak) 
Xi'an (Xi'an City Wall) 
Episode summary
At the beginning of this leg, teams were instructed to travel by train to Xi'an, and then find their next clue at the Drum Tower.
 This leg's Detour was a choice between Spray or Scroll. In Spray, teams traveled  to a car factory and spray painted the shell of a Chinese-made car in order to receive their next clue. In Scroll, teams traveled  to a textile factory and searched through ten bolts of fabric with a light table. When teams found and cut out the two Chinese characters stamped within two of the ten bolts, they received their next clue.
After completing the Detour, teams were instructed to travel to the Terra Cotta Warriors Museum, where they had to find the viewing platform of Pit 1 in order to locate their next clue. Teams were directed to the base of Mount Hua, where they had to travel by shuttle bus and gondola to the North Peak.
 In this leg's Roadblock, one team member had to search among 3,000 padlocks for the one that they could unlock using a provided key in order to receive their next clue.
Teams had to check in at the pit stop: the South Gate of the Xi'an City Wall.

Leg 12 (China → United States)

Episode 12: "4 Continents, 24 Cities, 40,000 Miles" (February 8, 2005)
Winners: Freddy & Kendra
Second Place: Kris & Jon
Third Place: Adam & Rebecca
Locations
Xi'an (Xi'an City Wall) 
 Xi'an → Honolulu, Hawaii
Honolulu (Puu Ualakaa State Park)
Honolulu (Hilo Hattie  Lōkahi Canoe Club) 
Honolulu (Kamaka Air) 
Honolulu (Kaneohe Bay)
 Honolulu → Chicago, Illinois
 Chicago (Chicago Water Tower)
Chicago (Gino's East)
Chicago (Ping Tom Memorial Park) 
Episode summary
At the beginning of this leg, teams were instructed to fly to Honolulu, Hawaii. Once in Honolulu, teams drove themselves to Puu Ualakaa State Park, where they found their next clue.
 This season's final Detour was a choice between Outfits or Outriggers. In Outfits, teams traveled  to a tropical clothing distributor and searched through racks filled with 165,000 Aloha shirts for the match to one displayed on a mannequin in order to receive their next clue. In Outriggers, teams had to drive  to a canoe club and, with the help of a provided assistant, paddle an outrigger canoe down a  course in order to receive their next clue.
After completing the Detour, teams had to travel to Kamaka Air in order to receive their next clue.
Teams were then instructed to fly to Chicago, Illinois. Once in Chicago, teams had to travel by train to the Chicago Water Tower in order to find their next clue. They were directed to Gino's East Pizzeria, where each team member had to eat two slices of deep dish pizza in order to receive their final clue directing them to the finish line at Ping Tom Memorial Park.
Additional notes
Legs 11 and 12 aired back-to-back as a special two-hour episode.

Reception

Critical response
At the time it aired, The Amazing Race 6 received negative reviews. Linda Holmes of Television Without Pity called this season disappointing. Scott Pierce of Deseret News said that his immediate reaction after the season finished was "I'm never going to watch this show again." Reece Forward of Screen Rant ranked this season as the show's second-worst, writing that it "is actively unlikable at points," but the season "escapes the bottom slot due to at least having a few teams that are likable or interesting". Since its airing, this season was ranked 9th out of the first 27 seasons by the Rob Has a Podcast Amazing Race correspondents in 2016. In 2021, Val Barone of TheThings ranked this season as the show's 4th best season. In 2022, Rhenn Taguiam of Game Rant ranked this season as the seventh-best season.

Controversy
The fifth episode featured two of the more controversial moments in the show's history. In Dakar, Senegal, Kendra Bentley, who had previously decried being in "ghetto Africa" complained, "This city is wretched and disgusting. And they just keep breeding and breeding in this poverty. I can't take it." These comments were largely denounced as racist due to the equation of people in Africa as animals. Bentley later claimed that her comments were taken out of context saying, "I was actually talking about the government and how they put people in these situations. They don’t give them opportunities for education or birth control." Lesser outrage was also directed at Rebecca Cardon for similar insensitive comments. On the way to the House of Slaves on Gorée Island, Cardon commented, "I'd love to get out of Africa. I can see why so many people escaped." Kevin McDonough of The Spokesman-Review wrote, "Now that's a novel way to look at the Middle Passage." 

Later in the episode, Jonathan Baker, angry at his wife, Victoria Fuller, for picking up his bag which he had dropped during a footrace to the mat, shoved her. He was modestly rebuked at the mat by Phil Keoghan, who saw Jonathan berating his wife but hadn't witnessed the shove. In response, critics and fans decried seeing possible domestic violence on television. Baker later stated "[t]he shove in Berlin was wrong. It was wrong and I should not have done it. I can't apologize any more because I really felt that it hurt."

References

External links
Official website

 06
2004 American television seasons
2005 American television seasons
Television shows filmed in Illinois
Television shows filmed in Iceland
Television shows filmed in Norway
Television shows filmed in Sweden
Television shows filmed in Senegal
Television shows filmed in Germany
Television shows filmed in Hungary
Television shows filmed in France
Television shows filmed in Italy
Television shows filmed in Ethiopia
Television shows filmed in Sri Lanka
Television shows filmed in China
Television shows filmed in Japan
Television shows filmed in Hawaii